Denis Selimovič (born 22 June 1979) is a Slovenian retired professional footballer who played for Icelandic Premier League club Keflavik Football Club. He is of Bosnian origin.

Selimovič previously also played for the Slovenian Premier league clubs Triglav Kranj, Ljubljana, Drava Ptuj, Primorje Ajdovščina and Interblock Ljubljana, Norwegian club Aalesunds FK in the Norwegian PL Tippeligaen and Bosnian club Željezničar Sarajevo in the Bosnian Premier League.

During his career Selimovič earned his bachelor's degree in economics. After a career as a professional footballer, Denis Selimovič remained in the football business as a football agent, obtained UEFA PRO Coaching Licence, and earned a master's degree in sports management from the University of Ljubljana. He is fluent in English, German and languages of Balkan countries (Croatia, Serbia, Bosnia...).

References

External links

1979 births
Living people
Slovenian footballers
Slovenian people of Bosnia and Herzegovina descent
NK Ljubljana players
NK Drava Ptuj players
NK Primorje players
Slovenian PrvaLiga players
Aalesunds FK players
FK Željezničar Sarajevo players
NK IB 1975 Ljubljana players
Slovenian expatriate footballers
Expatriate footballers in Norway
Expatriate footballers in Bosnia and Herzegovina
Eliteserien players
Association football midfielders
Knattspyrnudeild Keflavík players
Slovenian expatriate sportspeople in Iceland
Expatriate footballers in Iceland